Cayetano Álvarez Bardón (1881 – 1924),  was a Leonese language writer. His work "Cuentos en Dialecto Leonés" was one of the first books written in the Leonese language in the 20th century.

A street in León was named in Bardón's honour, to commemorate his contributions to literature in Leonese.

Works
 Cuentos en Dialecto Leonés (1907)

See also
 List of Leonese language writers

References

1881 births
1924 deaths
People from the Province of León
Leonese-language writers